Kerlikent is a rural locality (a selo) in Maloareshevsky Selsoviet, Kizlyarsky District, Republic of Dagestan, Russia. The population was 196 as of 2010, and the village has two streets.

Geography 
Kerlikent is located 28 km northeast of Kizlyar (the district's administrative centre) by road. Vishe-Talovka and Plodopitomnik are the nearest rural localities.

Nationalities 
Avars, Kumyks, Dargins, Chechens and Armenians live there.

References 

Rural localities in Kizlyarsky District